Jim Barron (born 19 October 1943) is an English former footballer who played as a goalkeeper. He played over 400 games in the Football League for a number of clubs over a twenty-year career.

Career
Barron began his playing career at Wolverhampton Wanderers in 1961. After time in the reserves, he made his league debut on 30 November 1963 in a goalless draw with Everton. He managed 7 starts in the 1963–64 season, deputising for Fred Davies, but apart from a solitary appearance the following season, these proved his only games for the club.

He moved to Chelsea in 1965 but found opportunities just as limited. It was only when he joined lower league Oxford United the following year that he gained regular football.

He went on to serve both Oxford and his subsequent club, Nottingham Forest, over 150 times each. He also had accomplished spells at Swindon Town, Connecticut Bicentennials and Peterborough United during a twenty-year professional career.

Barron is currently a first-team coach at League One Northampton Town, and was appointed as joint caretaker manager on 20 December 2006, following the resignation of John Gorman. After the appointment of Stuart Gray as new manager in January 2007, Barron reverted to his role as a first team coach.

He had previously stepped into similar roles at both Wolverhampton Wanderers and Birmingham City, and had been permanent manager of Cheltenham Town in 1988–89.

References

External links

Profile at Swindon-Town-FC.co.uk
 Connecticut Bicentennials stats

1943 births
Living people
People from Tantobie
Footballers from County Durham
English footballers
Association football goalkeepers
Wolverhampton Wanderers F.C. players
Chelsea F.C. players
Oxford United F.C. players
Nottingham Forest F.C. players
Swindon Town F.C. players
Peterborough United F.C. players
Northampton Town F.C. managers
English expatriates in Iceland
Expatriate football managers in Iceland
Cheltenham Town F.C. managers
English Football League players
North American Soccer League (1968–1984) players
Connecticut Bicentennials players
Aston Villa F.C. non-playing staff
Íþróttabandalag Akraness managers
Wolverhampton Wanderers F.C. non-playing staff
English expatriate sportspeople in the United States
Expatriate soccer players in the United States
English expatriate footballers
English football managers